Parts of Speech is the third studio album by Dessa, a member of Minneapolis indie hip hop collective Doomtree. It was released by Doomtree Records on June 25, 2013. An EP of remixes entitled Parts of Speech, Re-Edited was released  on June 17, 2014.

Reception
At Metacritic, which assigns a weighted average score out of 100 to reviews from mainstream critics, Parts of Speech received an average score of 78% based on 4 reviews, indicating "generally favorable reviews".

It debuted at number 74 on the Billboard 200 chart, with first-week sales of 5,800 copies in the United States.

Track listing

Personnel
Credits adapted from liner notes.
 Dessa – vocals, piano, executive production, art direction
 Dustin Kiel – guitar, piano, programming, executive production
 Sean McPherson – acoustic bass, electric bass
 Joey Van Phillips – drums, percussion, vibraphone
 Paper Tiger – production (on 2, 3 and 8)
 Lazerbeak – production (on 4 and 7), executive production
 Rebecca Arons – cello
 Nick Ogawa – cello
 Jessy Greene – violin
 Scott Agster – trombone
 Gabriel Douglas – vocals
 Aby Wolf – vocals
 Benjamin Burwell – vocals
 Mayda – guitar, synthesizer, drum programming
 Emily Dantuma – sampled cello
 Jake Wallenius – sampled drums
 Joe Mabbott – mixing, engineering
 Brady Moen – additional engineering, additional editing
 Bruce Templeton – mastering
 Kai Benson – art direction, design
 Bill Phelps – photography

Charts

References

External links
 

2013 albums
Dessa albums
Doomtree Records albums
Albums produced by Lazerbeak